Scythia Films is a Canadian independent entertainment company founded by Daniel Bekerman in 2008, and based in Toronto.

Projects 
Scythia Films jointly produced Robert Eggers' 2015 period horror The Witch with several other production companies.

In 2017, it was announced that Scythia Films along with Stellar Citizens would launch a development fund to produce between five to seven film and television projects. The first of these was reported to be an adaptation of Mark Vonnegut's The Eden Express: A Memoir of Insanity.

The company also jointly produced the 2018 political thriller Backstabbing for Beginners, starring Theo James and Ben Kingsley.

Scythia Films' produced the directorial debut of actor Viggo Mortensen, Falling, with five other companies. Falling had its world premiere at the 2020 Sundance Film Festival. It was intended to screen at the 2020 Cannes Film Festival until the festival was delayed because of the COVID-19 pandemic in France. It was shown at the 2020 Toronto International Film Festival.

References 

Film production companies of Canada
Canadian companies established in 2008
Television production companies of Canada